Ludwig Lange may refer to:
Ludwig Lange (architect) (1808–1868), German architect
Ludwig Lange (philologist) (1825–1885), German philologist and archaeologist
Ludwig Lange (physicist) (1863–1936), German physicist

See also
Lange (surname)